The 1997–98 Alpha Ethniki was the 62nd season of the highest football league of Greece. The season began on 30 August 1997 and ended on 18 May 1998. Olympiacos won their second consecutive and 27th Greek title.

Teams

Stadia and personnel

 1 On final match day of the season, played on 18 May 1998.

League table

Results

Top scorers

External links
Official Greek FA Site
RSSSF
Greek SuperLeague official Site
SuperLeague Statistics

Alpha Ethniki seasons
Greece
1